Harpactus elegans is a species of hunting wasps in the tribe Gorytini. It is found in Europe.

References 

 Harpactus elegans at inpn.mnhn.fr

Crabronidae
Insects described in 1832
Taxa named by Amédée Louis Michel le Peletier